The Thuringer is a breed of rabbit. It was originally known as the Thuringer Chamois due to having fur resembling that of the Chamois. They can be used for meat and fur, but make docile pets.

History
The Thuringer was developed in the state of Thuringia by David Gärtner, and is thought to be a mix of the Himalayan, the Silver, and the Flemish Giant rabbit breeds. It was first recognised in Germany in 1907, and was later recognised in the Netherlands in 1912.  The breed is somewhat rare outside of Europe and is not currently recognised by the ARBA.

Appearance
Thuringers are stocky, and have yellow-brown coats and black guard hairs. They can weigh from 8-10 lbs, and their ears can be 4-5 inches long. They have dark brown or chestnut eyes.

References

Rabbit breeds originating in Germany